Geomorphology is a peer-reviewed scientific journal about geomorphology.

External links 
 

Earth and atmospheric sciences journals
Elsevier academic journals
English-language journals
Geomorphology journals